Miriama Baker (born 1 September 1962) is a former rugby union player. She played in the first official match played by a New Zealand women's rugby team against the California Grizzlies in 1989; New Zealand won13–7.

Baker was selected for the 1991 World Cup squad and was the oldest in the team. Although she was in the team, she didn't get to play in the actual tournament. In 1992, she moved to Australia, but soon returned to Auckland in 1995.

References

External links 

 Black Ferns Profile

1962 births
Living people
New Zealand female rugby union players
New Zealand women's international rugby union players
People from Te Awamutu
Rugby union players from Waikato